Kim Yong-nam (born 4 February 1928) is a North Korean retired politician who served as the President of the Presidium of the Supreme People's Assembly of North Korea, from 1998 until 2019. Previously, he served as Minister of Foreign Affairs from 1983 to 1998. He was elected a member of the Presidium of the Workers' Party of Korea (WPK) in 2010.

Life and career
Accounts of Kim's early life vary. According to Fyodor Tertitskiy of NK News, he was born Kim Myong-sam to a Korean-Chinese family in the village of Dapu Shihe in Manchuria, in what is now the Liaoning province of China, in 1928. He came to North Korea with the Chinese People's Volunteer Army during the Korean War and chose to stay. Shortly before the end of the war in 1953, he went to the USSR to study. His experience with the USSR and China propelled his career in foreign affairs. In 1956, he became a section chief at the Foreign Department of the Central Committee of the Workers' Party of Korea and was a vice-minister for foreign affairs by 1962.

According to his official biography, Kim was born in Heijō, Chōsen (now Pyongyang, North Korea). After graduating from university, he worked as a teacher at the Central Party School, vice-department director of the WPK Central Committee, vice-minister of foreign affairs, and first vice-department director, department director and secretary of the WPK Central Committee, vice-premier of the administration council and concurrently Minister of Foreign Affairs. His elevation to Minister of Foreign Affairs is believed to have occurred as part of a reorganization of the diplomatic bureaucracy after the Rangoon bombing in October 1983. In 1988, he was responsible for the arrangement of unofficial diplomatic contacts with the United States through their respective embassies in Beijing.

As chairman of the Presidium, Kim Yong-nam was sometimes called the "nominal head of state" of North Korea. He held this office from September 5, 1998 to April 11, 2019. The President of the Presidium of the Supreme People's Assembly is sometimes considered the "number two official". The journalist and academic Don Oberdorfer described Kim as enigmatic, rigid in his official role, personally pleasant, highly intelligent, and an important figure behind the scenes in Pyongyang. He has been assessed as having high-level political and diplomatic skills.

Diplomatic activity

Kim embarked on a two-week tour of Mongolia, Algeria, Egypt, Ethiopia, and Singapore on July 20, 2007. On March 18, 2008, he embarked on a goodwill tour of four African states. Arriving in Namibia on March 20, he was present for the official completion of a new presidential residence that was built by North Korea. He also held talks with Namibian President Hifikepunye Pohamba and signed an agreement on public health cooperation with Pohamba. He subsequently visited Angola, where he met President José Eduardo dos Santos on March 24, the Democratic Republic of the Congo, where he met President Joseph Kabila on March 26, and Uganda, where he met President Yoweri Museveni on March 29. He returned to North Korea on April 1.

Kim also attended the 2008 Summer Olympics opening ceremony on August 8, 2008, 2014 Winter Olympics opening ceremony on February 7, 2014, 2018 Winter Olympics opening ceremony on February 9, 2018, and the 2018 FIFA World Cup opening ceremony on June 14, 2018. On July 14, 2009, Kim met Vietnamese president Nguyen Minh Triet on the sidelines of the 15th Non-Aligned Movement Summit in Egypt. Kim represented North Korea at the 2015 Victory Day parade in Moscow on May 9, 2015, commemorating the 70th anniversary of the defeat of Nazi Germany in World War II. He also paid an official visit to Equatorial Guinea on May 19, 2016 to attend the presidential inauguration of Teodoro Obiang Nguema Mbasogo.

As representative of the Democratic People's Republic of Korea, he attended the investiture ceremony of Andrés Manuel López Obrador as president of Mexico on December 1, 2018.

Retirement

He retired on April 11, 2019 in a government reshuffle, aged 91, after almost 21 years as President of the SPA Presidium and roughly four decades as Party Politburo member (having first been elected to the body in August 1978). During the 2022 celebration of the Day of the Foundation of the Republic, he participated in the central concert and banquet.

Works

See also
 Politics of North Korea

References

External links
 

1928 births
Living people
Chairmen of the Presidium of the Supreme People's Assembly
Foreign ministers of North Korea
Heads of state of North Korea
People from Pyongyang
Members of the Presidium of the Workers' Party of Korea
Members of the 5th Political Committee of the Workers' Party of Korea
Members of the 8th Politburo of the Workers' Party of Korea
Members of the 6th Presidium of the Workers' Party of Korea
Members of the 7th Presidium of the Workers' Party of Korea
Members of the 6th Secretariat of the Workers' Party of Korea